The 2011 Moldovan Super Cup was the fifth Moldovan Super Cup, an annual Moldovan football match played by the winner of the national football league (the National Division) and the winner of the national Cup. The match was played between Dacia Chișinău, champions of the 2010–11 National Division, and Iskra-Stal Rîbnița, winners of the 2010–11 Moldovan Cup. It was held at the Sheriff Small Arena on 8 July 2011.

Dacia Chișinău won the match 1–0.

Match

References

2011–12 in Moldovan football
FC Iskra-Stal matches
FC Dacia Chișinău matches
Moldovan Super Cup